Tucker is the ninth studio album by Joe Jackson, released in August 1988 by A&M Records. It is the soundtrack for the Francis Ford Coppola film Tucker: The Man and His Dream. The album earned Jackson a Grammy nomination for Best Album of Original Instrumental Background Score Written for a Motion Picture or TV.

Track listing 
All songs written, arranged and produced by Joe Jackson, except where noted.

Personnel
 Musicians
 Joe Jackson – piano, synthesizer, percussion, saucepans, vocals
 Paul Sprong - trumpet (high notes)
 Raul d'Oliveira – trumpet (wah-wah mute)
 Pete Thomas – alto saxophone, flute, tenor solo on "Shape in a Drape"
 David Bitelli – tenor saxophone, clarinet, tenor solo on "Rhythm Delivery"
 Bill Charleson – alto saxophone, flute
 Tony Coe – solo clarinet, bass clarinet
 Rick Taylor – trombone
 Vinnie Zummo – guitar
 Dave Green – bass
 Gary Burke – drums
 Frank Ricotti – percussion
 Ed Roynesdal – Kurzweil synthesizer programming and sampling, solo violin
 Arlette Fibon – Ondes Martenot

 Production
 Joe Jackson - arrangements, producer
 David Anderle – coordinator
 Gavyn Wright – string director and coordinator

Charts

References

External links 
 Tucker album information at The Joe Jackson Archive

Joe Jackson (musician) soundtracks
1988 soundtrack albums
A&M Records soundtracks
Comedy film soundtracks
Drama film soundtracks